Moraria is a genus of copepods belonging to the family Canthocamptidae.

The genus has almost cosmopolitan distribution.

Species:
 Moraria acuta Borutzky, 1952 
 Moraria affinis Chappuis, 1927

References

Harpacticoida
Crustacean genera